Flyorov may refer to:
Georgy Flyorov (1913–1990), a Soviet nuclear physicist
Ivan Flyorov (1905–1941), the commander of the first battery of Katyusha rocket artillery during the World War II
Konstantin Konstantinovich Flyorov (1904–1980), a Soviet paleontologist and paleoartist.

Russian-language surnames